"Ha! Ha! Houdini!" is a poem by Patti Smith, published as a chapbook in 1977.

Notes

External links 
 

Poetry by Patti Smith
1977 poems
Books by Patti Smith
Chapbooks
1977 poetry books